Pilodeudorix baginei is a butterfly in the family Lycaenidae. It is found in Uganda, western Kenya and north-western Tanzania. The habitat consists of forests.

References

Butterflies described in 1991
Deudorigini